Narek is a village in the Artashat Municipality of the Ararat Province of Armenia. In 1984, the town was named after Grigor Narekatsi. Narek was also a village in Western Armenia (Eastern Anatolia).

References 

Kiesling, Rediscovering Armenia, p. 27, available online at the US embassy to Armenia's website
World Gazetteer: Armenia – World-Gazetteer.com

Populated places in Ararat Province